Butyrki is a rural locality (a khutor) in Uspensky Selsoviet of Akhtubinsky District, Astrakhan Oblast, Russia. The population was 48 as of 2010. There is 1 street.

Geography 
Butyrki is located 16 km southeast of Akhtubinsk (the district's administrative centre) by road. Uspenka is the nearest rural locality.

References 

Rural localities in Akhtubinsky District